Jean-Marc Robitaille (born 11 September 1955) was a member of the House of Commons of Canada from 1988 to 1993 and was the mayor of Terrebonne, Quebec from 1997 to 2016. His career was in real estate. On March 15, 2018, he was arrested by the Unité permanente anticorruption and faces criminal accusations of corruption and abuse of trust from his time as mayor.

Born in Lévis, Quebec, Robitaille was elected in the 1988 federal election at the Terrebonne electoral district for the Progressive Conservative party. He served in the 34th Canadian Parliament after which he was defeated by Bloc Québécois candidate Benoît Sauvageau in the 1993 federal election.

He became mayor of Terrebonne on 2 November 1997 and was acclaimed for another term in the 2005 municipal election. He was subsequently re-elected in 2009, and 2013.

Electoral record

References

External links

1955 births
Living people
Mayors of Terrebonne, Quebec
Members of the House of Commons of Canada from Quebec
People from Lévis, Quebec
Progressive Conservative Party of Canada MPs
French Quebecers
Criminals from Quebec